Azanchevsky (masculine) or Azanchevskaya (feminine) is a Russian last name. It is derived from the Turkic word meaning muezzin.

People with the last name
Mikhail Azanchevsky, director of the St. Petersburg Conservatory in 1871–1876

References

Notes

Sources
Ю. А. Федосюк (Yu. A. Fedosyuk). "Русские фамилии: популярный этимологический словарь" (Russian Last Names: a Popular Etymological Dictionary). Москва, 2006. 



Russian-language surnames